Regents is the plural of regent, while Regent's is the possessive form.

Regents, The Regents, or Regent's may also refer to:

Bands
Regents (punk rock band)
Regents (quartet)
The Regents (doo-wop band)
The Regents (new wave band)

Education
Board of Regents, a type of governing body of institutions of higher learning in the United States
Regent's College, an educational complex in Regent's Park, London, England
Regents Examinations, standardized tests given to high school students through the New York State Department of Education
 Regents External Degree Program (1971–1984) and Regents College (1984–2001), programs of the University of the State of New York
Regents School of Austin, a Christian school in Austin, Texas
Regents Theological College, a theological college in Nantwich, Cheshire, England
Regent's University London, a private university
 The Regent's School, an international coeducational boarding school on the eastern seaboard of Thailand

Other uses
 Regent's Canal, canal in London, England, UK

See also
 Regency (disambiguation)
 Regent (disambiguation)
 Regent's Park (disambiguation)